William Edgar Rayner Goddard, Baron Goddard,  (10 April 1877 – 29 May 1971) was Lord Chief Justice of England from 1946 to 1958, known for his strict sentencing and mostly conservative views despite being the first Lord Chief Justice to be appointed by a Labour government, as well as the first to possess a law degree. Goddard's no-nonsense reputation was reflected in a number of nicknames that he acquired, which included: 'The Tiger', 'Justice-in-a-jiffy', and—from Winston Churchill—'Lord God-damn'. He was considered one of the last hanging judges.

Early life and career

William Edgar Rayner Goddard was born on 10 April 1877 at Bassett Road, Notting Hill, London, the second of three sons and the third of five children of the solicitor Charles Goddard (22 February 1843 – 27 May 1922) and his wife Janet née Jobson, who was from Sheffield (1851 – 8 June 1934). He went by his third name Rayner throughout his life.

Goddard attended Marlborough College, where he decided on a career in law. In later life he vigorously denied the frequent claims of Lord Jowitt that he had amused his school contemporaries by reciting, word for word, the form of the death sentence upon those whom he disliked. He later attended Trinity College, Oxford and graduated with an upper second-class degree in jurisprudence in 1898, and gained a Blue in athletics. He was called to the Bar by the Inner Temple in 1899.

On 31 May 1906 Goddard married Marie Schuster, the daughter of the banker Sir Felix Otto Schuster, with whom he was to have three daughters. She died on 16 May 1928 during an operation at the age of 44. Goddard never remarried.

Goddard built a strong reputation in commercial cases on the Western Circuit and was appointed as Recorder of Poole (a part-time Judgeship) in 1917. Goddard was appointed a King's Counsel in 1923, transferred to be Recorder of Bath in 1925, and eventually Recorder of Plymouth in 1928. He was elected a Bencher of his inns in 1929 and undertook work for the Barristers' Benevolent Association. In the general election of 1929, Goddard agreed, against his better judgement, to contest the Kensington South constituency as an unofficial Conservative candidate. The sitting Conservative MP, Sir William Davison, had been a defendant in a divorce case, and a local committee thought the newly enfranchised young women voters would refuse to support him. In the end, Goddard, running under the slogan "Purity Goddard", came last in the poll, winning only 15 per cent of the vote, and the sitting member was returned.

Judicial appointment
On 5 April 1932 Goddard was appointed a Justice of the High Court and assigned to the King's Bench Division, receiving the customary knighthood later that year.

In 1938, the Administration of Justice (Miscellaneous Provisions) Act authorized the appointment of three additional Lords Justices of Appeal: Goddard was one of the three new Lords Justices appointed under the Act, after only six years in the High Court.

Goddard was known for turning out well-argued and legally convincing judgments. He would deliver stern diatribes to criminals, but his sentences were usually moderate, even when he was personally offended by the crime. After another six-year stint, he was appointed as a Lord of Appeal in Ordinary upon the death of Lord Atkin in 1944 and received as a Law lord a life peerage. He chose the title Baron Goddard of Aldbourne in the County of Wiltshire.

Lord Chief Justice
Viscount Caldecote, the Lord Chief Justice of England and Wales, suffered a stroke in 1945 and suddenly resigned, creating a vacancy at an inopportune moment. The tradition was for the appointment to be a political one, with the Attorney-General stepping up to take it. However, Hartley Shawcross was unwilling and considered too young. The appointment of a stop-gap candidate was expected. As Goddard explained in an August 1970 interview with David Yallop: "They had to give the job to somebody. There wasn't anybody else available, so Attlee appointed me." At the time Attlee and Goddard didn't know each other. The appointment, in January 1946, came at a time when the crime rate, and public concern over crime, were both increasing. Through his judgments, Goddard made it clear that he felt that stronger sentences were the way to tackle both. However, Goddard was also known to give young offenders probation rather than custodial sentences, if he believed that they would respond.

Goddard was the first Lord Chief Justice to hold a law degree.

Despite his appointment as a stop-gap, Goddard served twelve and a half years as Lord Chief Justice before stepping down in September 1958.

Drunk Drivers

On 5 December 1950 Goddard said that in most cases drunk drivers should be jailed.

ID Cards

In June 1951, Goddard ruled in Willcock v Muckle that giving police the power to demand an ID card "from all and sundry, for instance, from a lady who may leave her car outside a shop longer than she should", made people resentful of the police and "inclines them to obstruct the police instead of to assist them." Therefore, for the police to demand that individuals show their ID cards was unlawful because it was not relevant to the purposes for which the card was adopted. ID Cards, in force since the start of World War II, were abolished in February 1952.

Craig and Bentley

In December 1952 Goddard presided over the trial of Christopher Craig and Derek Bentley, accused of the murder of PC Sidney Miles at a Croydon warehouse on 2 November 1952. 16-year-old Craig had shot and killed PC Miles while resisting arrest on the roof of a factory he intended to break into. Bentley, who was 19 but of limited intelligence, had gone with him and was accused of urging Craig to shoot, having called out to him, "let him have it, Chris", when a policeman, Sergeant Frederick Fairfax, asked Craig for the gun. Fairfax was wounded by Craig.

Lord Goddard directed the jury at the trial that, in law, Bentley was as guilty of firing the shot as Craig, even though there was contradictory evidence as to whether Bentley was aware that Craig was carrying a gun. During the trial, Goddard made no reference to Bentley's mental state, apart from when Christmas Humphreys asked Bentley to read a statement he had allegedly made to Police Officers after his arrest. Goddard told Humphreys that Bentley couldn't read.

After 75 minutes of deliberations, the jury returned a guilty verdict in respect of both defendants. Craig was too young for a death sentence, but Bentley was not. Nevertheless, the jury had exceptionally returned a plea of mercy in favour of Bentley along with the guilty verdict.  The decision passed to the Home Secretary, David Maxwell Fyfe, to decide whether clemency should be granted. After reading Home Office psychiatric reports and a petition signed by 200 MPs, he rejected the request and Bentley was hanged by Albert Pierrepoint on 28 January 1953. Craig was sent to prison and released in 1963 after serving ten-and-a-half years. Derek Bentley had his conviction quashed in July 1998 with the appeal trial judge, Lord Bingham, noting that Lord Goddard had denied the defendant "the fair trial which is the birthright of every British citizen."

Political context

Goddard chose to continue his involvement with trials on the front line, and opted to judge ordinary High Court cases as he was entitled to do.

He presided over the libel trial at which Harold Laski, Chairman of the Labour Party, attempted unsuccessfully to sue the Daily Express for damages when it quoted him as saying that the party must take power "even if it means violence". On 13 June 1965, Goddard told Laski's brother, Neville Laski, "I didn't agree with the findings of the jury. I have always been unhappy about the case and I often think about it. I can say it has been on my conscience. I want to add that your brother was not a good witness. He couldn't answer simple yes or no when questioned and made long speeches. Slade was no match for Pat Hastings".

In 1948 backbench pressure in the House of Commons forced through an amendment to the Criminal Justice Bill to the effect that capital punishment should be suspended for five years and all death sentences automatically commuted to life imprisonment. The Bill also sought to abolish judicial corporal punishment in both its then forms, the cat-o'-nine-tails and the birch. Goddard attacked the Bill in the House of Lords, making his maiden speech, saying he agreed with the abolition of the "cat" but not birching, which he regarded as an effective punishment for young offenders. He also disagreed with the automatic commutation of death sentences, believing that it was contrary to the Bill of Rights.

In a debate, he once referred to a case he had tried of an agricultural labourer who had assaulted a jeweller; Goddard gave him a short two months' imprisonment and twelve strokes of the birch because "I was not then depriving the country of the services of a good agricultural labourer over the harvest". The suspension of capital punishment was reversed by 181 to 28, and a further amendment to retain the birch was also passed (though the Lords were later forced to give way on this issue). As the crime rate continued to rise, Goddard became convinced that the Criminal Justice Act 1948 was responsible as it was a 'Gangster's Charter'. He held a strong belief that punishment had to be punitive in order to be effective, a view also shared at the time by Lord Denning.

Bodkin Adams case

During the committal hearing of John Bodkin Adams on a charge of murder in January 1957, Goddard was seen dining with Sir Roland Gwynne (Mayor of Eastbourne from 1929 to 1931) and chairman of the local panel of magistrates, and ex-Attorney-General Hartley Shawcross at an hotel in Lewes: the subject of their conversation is unreported and unknown. Goddard had already appointed Patrick Devlin to try Adams's case. Three months later, on 15 April, while the jury was out discussing the verdict on Adams's first charge of murder, Goddard telephoned to Devlin to suggest to him, if Adams were found not guilty, to grant Adams bail before he was tried on a second count of murder. Devlin was at first surprised since a person accused of murder had never been given bail before in British legal history, but on consideration saw its merit, but this move has been plausibly suggested as a warning to the prosecution of strong judicial displeasure over the Attorney-General's plan to proceed with the second indictment. As Lord Chief Justice, Goddard had a responsibility for the conduct of all courts in England and Wales, from magistrates' courts to the Court of Appeal.

Adams was acquitted on the first count of murder, and the second charge was controversially dropped via a nolle prosequi—an act by the prosecution that was later called by Devlin an "abuse of process", saying: "The use of nolle prosequi to conceal the deficiencies of the prosecution was an abuse of process, which left an innocent man under the suspicion that there might have been something in the talk of mass murder after all". The pathologist Francis Camps considered the deaths of up to of 163 of Adams' patients might be suspicious, but he only conducted post-mortem examinations on two of these which produced nothing of significance. The assistant investigating officer, Charles Hewett suspected political interference to ensure Adams' acquittal, rather than accepting that the police investigation was sloppy, and their case was weak.

A month after Adams' trial, on 10 May 1957, Goddard heard a contempt of court case against Rolls House Publishing, publishers of Newsweek, and chain of newsagents W.H. Smith, who on 1 April during Adams's trial had respectively published and distributed an issue of the magazine containing two paragraphs of material "highly prejudicial to the accused", saying that Adams's victim count could be "as high as 400". Each company was fined £50. Goddard made no mention of his contact with Roland Gwynne or of a potential conflict of interest, if any existed.

Retirement

After his retirement as Lord Chief Justice, Goddard was appointed to the Order of the Bath as a Knight Grand Cross (GCB) on 30 September 1958. In January 1959, four months after retiring as Lord Chief Justice, Goddard resumed regular judicial sittings in the House of Lords, continuing until 1964 when he fully retired. During this period he was a member of the judicial committee of the House of Lords in several controversial appeal cases, including Director of Public Prosecutions v Smith (1961), Sykes v Director of Public Prosecutions (1962), and Attorney-General for Northern Ireland v Gallagher (1963). In April 1959 Goddard took the unprecedented step of returning to sit in the Court of Appeal for almost a year to help clear a backlog of appeal cases.

After retiring as Lord Chief Justice, Goddard continued to intervene occasionally in Lords debates and public speeches to put forward his views in favour of judicial corporal punishment. On 12 December 1960 he said in the House of Lords that the law was too much biased in favour of the criminal. Goddard also expressed his opposition to the legalisation of homosexual acts on 24 May 1965. His final speech in the House of Lords was in April 1968 at the age of 91, praising the City of London's law courts.

August 1970 interview

In the final interview he gave, in August 1970, Goddard told David Yallop that being Lord Chief Justice was not an easy job. When Yallop, who believed that Craig should have been imprisoned for manslaughter and Bentley thus cleared, asked Goddard about Derek Bentley's execution, he received the following reply, "Yes, I thought that Bentley was going to be reprieved. He certainly should have been. There's no doubt in my mind whatsoever that Bentley should have been reprieved". Goddard also said if Fyfe had consulted him he would have recommended a reprieve.

Goddard remarked that what troubled him was not Bentley being hanged when he was close to the minimum age, but the hard facts of the case, such as his being innocent of the murder of PC Miles.

Goddard went on to criticise David Maxwell Fyfe in the two-hour interview, saying that he made the recommendation to mercy to Maxwell-Fyfe and that "Bentley's execution was an act of supreme illogicality. I was never consulted over it (the decision and execution). In fact he (Maxwell Fyfe) never consulted anyone. The blame for Bentley's execution rests solely with Fyfe". It is true that Maxwell Fyfe, who died in January 1967, was as much a supporter of the death penalty as Goddard. However, despite stating his opposition to Bentley's execution, Goddard still expressed his strong support for the death penalty and asserted that the law was biased in favour of the criminal.

Whether Goddard felt this at the time of Bentley's execution, or was saying it in hindsight, remains a moot point. Goddard's claims were disputed by John Parris in his book Scapegoat (Duckworth), published in 1991. Parris, who died in September 1996, was Craig's barrister at the 1952 trial, and wrote that Goddard told Maxwell Fyfe to ignore the jury's recommendation for mercy, and that Bentley must be hanged.

Death

Goddard died at his home in The Temple, London on 29 May 1971. He was cremated four days later. No memorial service was held. When alive, Goddard said he did not want one as they were "exercises in hypocrisy". He left over £100,000 in his will, published in July 1971.

Criticism

After Goddard's death, he was attacked in the columns of The Times by Bernard Levin, who described him as "a calamity" and accused him of vindictiveness and of being a malign influence on penal reform. Levin had also attacked Goddard when he retired as Lord Chief Justice 13 years earlier in a Spectator article, saying he walked hand in hand with ignorance on one side of him and barbarism on the other. In The Times on 8 June 1971, Levin wrote (referring to Goddard's assertion in 1970 that he had been "very unhappy" about Bentley being hanged) that "if Goddard did indeed claim this, it was a breathtaking piece of hypocrisy, in view of his conduct of the case". Afterwards Levin was blackballed by the Garrick Club, a favourite resort of both lawyers and journalists, when his application for membership came up.

On 30 July 1998, the Court of Appeal quashed Derek Bentley's conviction on the basis of Goddard's misdirection to the jury which, according to Lord Bingham, "must [...] have driven the jury to conclude that they had little choice but to convict." He added that the summing-up of the case was "such as to deny the appellant [Bentley] the fair trial which is the birthright of every British citizen". Bingham also, however, acknowledged that Goddard was "one of the outstanding criminal judges of the century", and underlined the change in social standards between 1953 and 1998. Bentley was not, contrary to occasional media reports, acquitted; but in view of the passage of time it is scarcely possible that he would ever have been retried. The decision to review the case decades after Bentley's death was not without criticism.

In popular culture and legal legend

Lord Goddard was portrayed by the actor Michael Gough in the film Let Him Have It in 1991.

In "Prisoner and Escort", the first episode of the popular 1973 sitcom Porridge, Norman Stanley Fletcher says about strict and authoritarian Prison Officer Mackay: "I bet he's the secretary of the Lord Chief Justice Goddard appreciation society". A remark referring to strict views on criminals, society and justice which Mackay and Goddard largely shared.

According to his clerk, Goddard ejaculated when passing a death sentence on such a regular basis, that a fresh pair of trousers had to be brought to court on those occasions.

References

Lord Goddard: His career and cases by Glyn Jones and Eric Grimshaw (Allan Wingate, London, 1958).
Lord Goddard: My Years With the Lord Chief Justice by Arthur Smith (Weidenfeld & Nicolson, London, 1959) is a sympathetic biography by Goddard's chief clerk.
"To Encourage the Others" by David Yallop (Allen 1971). The first authoritative and thorough study of the Bentley/Craig case.
Scapegoat, John Parris (Duckworth 1991). An account of the Craig and Bentley trial by Craig's barrister.
Daly v Cannon [1954] 1 WLR 261 (QB).

External links

1877 births
1971 deaths
Goddard, Rayner
Goddard, Rayner
Law lords
Goddard, Rayner
Goddard, Rayner
British heraldists
Queen's Bench Division judges
Members of the Judicial Committee of the Privy Council
Knights Bachelor
Members of the Privy Council of the United Kingdom
Knights Grand Cross of the Order of the Bath
Members of the Inner Temple
English King's Counsel
20th-century King's Counsel
Lords Justices of Appeal
Life peers created by George VI